Ahmamau is a village in Sarojaninagar block of Lucknow district, Uttar Pradesh, India. According to 2011 Census of India the population of the village is 3427; 1,793 are males and 1,634 are females.

It is the seat of a gram panchayat, which also includes the village of Ardonamau.

References

Villages in Lucknow district